On November 5, 2007, Showtime ordered 13 new episodes for a fourth season of Weeds. It started on Monday, June 16, 2008 and concluded on Monday, September 15, 2008.

The season opener "Mother Thinks the Birds Are After Her" was the last episode with "Little Boxes" as the theme song until season eight. The opening credits of subsequent episodes, after a recap of previous episodes, begin with a video title card unique to each episode. Each title card also has a prop or part of the setting that refers to a plot element in the episode.

Silas and Shane are aged 17 and 13 respectively. However, Silas turns 18 at the end of the season.

Plot 
Having lost both her Agrestic grow house and her residence in fires, Nancy relocates her family to the fictional California town of Ren Mar, near the Tijuana-San Diego border. The Botwin family move in with Andy and Judah's father Lenny (Albert Brooks) in Ren Mar, and Guillermo hires Nancy to smuggle in illegal drugs from Mexico. 

Celia is in jail due to being the official lessee of Nancy's grow house, and she bargains to spy on Nancy for the DEA in exchange for her release. Guillermo's men catch Celia spying, but Nancy convinces them to spare Celia's life by claiming she was her partner. Andy enters a coyote partnership with Doug, who has recently moved to Ren Mar to evade questions about Agrestic's finances. Doug falls for an undocumented woman he names "Mermex" after witnessing her unsuccessful attempt to enter the United States. Using his coyote enterprise, Doug locates Mermex and gets her into California; however, Mermex is repelled by Doug's nature and falls in love with Andy. Scorned, Doug turns Mermex in to immigration. Isabelle is unenthusiastic about moving in with Dean in Detroit, and she pesters Celia to let her stay in Ren Mar. Silas sets up a grow room in the rear of a gourmet cheese shop owned by a neighbor, Lisa (Julie Bowen), an attractive woman in her thirties. Despite knowing that Silas is underage, Lisa becomes intimate with him, but reveals to Silas that her interests in him are just financial and physical. Heartbroken, Silas spurns her advances and ends their business relationship. Shane attacks the most popular boy at school without provocation in order to acquire a fearsome reputation. He also attracts the admiring attention of two classmates, Simone and Harmony, with whom he loses his virginity in a threesome. Simone and Harmony later help Shane sell weed at the school.

Guillermo's boss, whose identity is unknown to Nancy, has her open a maternity store. Nancy believes it is solely for money laundering until she finds a tunnel entrance in the back room. Though she is initially told it is for transporting marijuana, Nancy later learns that the tunnel is also used to transport other things, including guns and women. Unable to accept the human trafficking operation, Nancy becomes an informant for DEA Captain Roy Till, even though she has begun a sexual relationship with Guillermo's crime boss, who is revealed as Esteban Reyes (Demián Bichir), the mayor of Tijuana. The resulting DEA raid and shootout ends with most of the Mexican drug runners, including Guillermo, arrested.

While working at Nancy's store, Celia begins abusing the readily-available drugs. Isabelle and Dean stage an intervention, which spurs Celia to enter rehab and make amends to her family. Dean insists that Celia locate and make amends with their oldest daughter, Quinn, who departed during the show's inaugural episode for a Mexican boarding school named Casa Reforma. Newly graduated, Quinn and her boyfriend, Rodolfo, drug Celia and hold her hostage in order to extract a $200,000 ransom.

Following the DEA raid, Esteban's lieutenant, Cesar (Enrique Castillo) obtains a report about the raid from a mole in the DEA. As a result, Till's partner/lover, Agent Schlatter, is brutally tortured and mutilated by Esteban's cartel until he gives up Nancy's name. Upon learning that Nancy had alerted the DEA to his tunnel, Esteban captures Nancy and intends to have her killed. In a final attempt to save her life, Nancy hands Esteban an ultrasound and reveals that she is pregnant with his child.

Cast

Main cast 
Mary-Louise Parker as Nancy Botwin (13 episodes)
Elizabeth Perkins as Celia Hodes (13 episodes)
Hunter Parrish as Silas Botwin (13 episodes)
Alexander Gould as Shane Botwin (13 episodes)
Allie Grant as Isabelle Hodes (9 episodes)
Justin Kirk as Andy Botwin (13 episodes)
Kevin Nealon as Doug Wilson (13 episodes)

Special guest stars 
Guillermo Díaz as Guillermo García Gómez
Demián Bichir as Esteban Reyes

Departures 
Romany Malco, Tonye Patano, and Indigo do not return, with their characters' whereabouts unknown after the fire in Majestic. Patano returns as Heylia for a four-episode arc in season seven, and Malco returns as Conrad for one episode in season eight.

Recurring cast 

Albert Brooks as Lenny Botwin
Julie Bowen as Lisa Ferris
Andy Milder as Dean Hodes
Jillian Rose Reed as Simone
Hannah Marks as Harmony
Maulik Pancholy as Sanjay Patel
Renée Victor as Lupita
Fatso-Fasano as Marvin
Joey Luthman as Rad Ferris
Haley Hudson as Quinn Hodes
Becky Thyre as Pam Gruber
Julanne Chidi Hill as Clinique
Hemky Madera as Ignacio Morero, Jr.
Jack Stehlin as Captain Roy Till
Anthony Ledesma as Bodyguard
Ramón Franco as Dirty Man
Paul Alayo as Chewie
Kevin Alejandro as Rudolpho
Gloria Garayua as Reyna
Alejandro Patino as Alphonso
Emilio Rivera as El Coyote
Andrew Rothenberg as DEA Agent Phil Shlatter
Onahoua Rodriguez as Mermex
Richard Azurdia as Davenport
Lisa Darr as Ann Carilli
Lee Majors as Minute-Man Leader
Rigo Sanchez as Mexican Mechanic
Jo Farkas as Bubbie
Jessica Chaffin as Cracklynn
John Lafayette as Downtown Rehab Counselor
J. Anthony Pena as Guillermo's Henchman
Greg Pitts as Billy Boesky
Ivo Nandi as Claudio
Mario Revolori as Dweeb
Manuel Urrego as Luis

Episodes

References

External links 
 
 

 
2008 American television seasons